The siege of Gaeta can refer to several historical sieges of the city of Gaeta in Italy:

Siege of Gaeta (1435), siege by Alfonso V of Aragon against a Genoese garrison
Siege of Gaeta (1707), Austrian attack during the War of the Spanish Succession
Siege of Gaeta (1734), French and Spanish attack during the War of the Polish Succession
Siege of Gaeta (1806), French attack during the War of the Third Coalition of the Napoleonic Wars
Siege of Gaeta (1815), Austrian attack during the Neapolitan War
Siege of Gaeta (1860), Piedmontese attack during the Italian Unification Wars